Events in the year 1028 in Norway.

Incumbents
 Monarchs – Olaf Haraldsson, Cnut the Great

Events
The king, Olaf Haraldsson, fled from Norway to Russia, and Cnut the Great claimed reign of Norway.

References

Norway